Mitchell Pacwa  (born July 27, 1949) is an American Jesuit priest. He is president and founder of Ignatius Productions and is now the senior fellow of the St. Paul Center for Biblical Theology.

Education 
Pacwa completed high school at Archbishop Quigley Preparatory Seminary in 1967 with the intention of becoming a priest for the Archdiocese of Chicago. He decided that he wanted to be a Jesuit in high school and was accepted after his freshman year at Loyola University Chicago. He earned a bachelor's degree in philosophy and theology from University of Detroit Mercy and was ordained a priest of the Society of Jesus in 1976. He later completed Master of Divinity and Bachelor of Sacred Theology degrees from the Jesuit School of Theology in Berkeley, California followed by a Doctor of Philosophy in Old Testament from Vanderbilt University.

He is an accomplished linguist, speaking several ancient languages including Latin, Koine Greek, Hebrew, Aramaic, and Ugaritic, as well as the modern languages of English, German, Spanish, Polish, Modern Hebrew, Arabic, French, and Italian. He is of Polish descent.

Ministry 

He has taught at Loyola Academy Wilmette, IL, Loyola University Chicago and the University of Dallas.

In 1983, he became a show host for the Eternal Word Television Network (EWTN) and relocated to Alabama. On EWTN, Pacwa hosts or has hosted the following TV shows: EWTN Live, Threshold of Hope, The Holy Rosary in the Holy Land, and Scripture and Tradition with Fr. Mitch Pacwa. Pacwa is also the host of the Wednesday Open Line program and EWTN Live on the EWTN radio network. He also occasionally offers the televised Daily Mass on EWTN.

Books

References

External links 

 Mitch Pacwa profile and books on Goodreads
 Fr. Pacwa on The George Jarkesy Show 

1949 births
20th-century American Jesuits
21st-century American Jesuits
American people of Polish descent
Living people
University of Dallas faculty
Vanderbilt University alumni
University of Detroit Mercy alumni
Linguists from the United States
American television evangelists